On February 24, 2005, a man shot his ex-wife and son outside the courthouse in Tyler, Texas, then engaged police and court officers in a shootout. David Hernandez Arroyo, Sr. opened fire in front of the courthouse with a Type 56S rifle, killing his ex-wife, and wounding his son. A downtown resident, Mark Alan Wilson, attempted to intervene but was fatally shot. Arroyo was fatally shot by police after a high-speed pursuit.

Details

Shootout begins
At the time of the shooting, Maribel Estrada and her 23-year-old son, David Hernandez Arroyo, Jr., were entering the courthouse for a hearing regarding her ex-husband's failure to pay child support after their 2004 divorce. Estrada's lawyer later stated that his client did not believe her ex-husband to be dangerous.

Arroyo, who had parked and lain in wait near the courthouse, approached his ex-wife and son on the steps outside the Smith County Courthouse and fired on them with an AK-47 rifle. Estrada was hit in the head and killed instantly, and Arroyo's son was hit in the leg and wounded. Both fell to the ground at the rear courthouse steps.

Nearby law enforcement officers already present at the courthouse responded to the initial shots and began exchanging fire with Arroyo. At this point, the law enforcement officers were only armed with pistols, and Arroyo was able to wound several and force them to retreat.

Mark Alan Wilson
A local resident, Mark Alan Wilson, was in his downtown loft when he heard the shooting begin. He looked out his window and saw Arroyo at the courthouse steps engaged in a shootout with law enforcement. Wilson, who held a Texas concealed handgun permit, immediately armed himself with his Colt .45 caliber pistol, and left his residence to intervene in the gun battle. Because Arroyo was already engaged in a heated gun battle with sheriff's deputies and Tyler police officers, he did not see Wilson approach from behind.

As Wilson approached Arroyo from behind, Arroyo was taking aim at his son whom he had already shot in the leg and wounded. Acting to defend the life of Arroyo's son, Wilson fired a round from approximately 50 feet, which struck Arroyo in the back, causing him to stumble and taking his attention away from his son. A witness who saw Wilson's round strike Arroyo reported seeing "white puffs of powder-like substance" come from Arroyo's clothing. This is believed to be the first time Arroyo was hit or injured during his attack on the courthouse.

Wilson was forced to take cover behind Arroyo's truck in a prone position and exchanged fire with Arroyo. As Arroyo began to approach Wilson's position, he stood up from behind cover and fired again, hitting Arroyo. Unknown to Wilson, Arroyo was wearing a bulletproof vest, rendering Wilson's shots ineffective. Arroyo eventually fired a shot that struck Wilson, who faltered and fell from the view of witnesses, face down behind Arroyo's truck. Arroyo then walked up to Wilson and fired three more shots at him, killing him.

Pursuit and Arroyo's death
Officers from the Tyler Police Department, including Officer Wayne Allen was operating the pursuit vehicle with Sergeant Rusty Jacks, a trained sniper armed with a Colt AR-15 rifle, as his passenger, soon arrived on the scene. After more than 116 rounds had been fired, Arroyo attempted to flee and a pursuit ensued. The pursuit continued from the city streets of Tyler to a nearby highway.

At the terminus of the pursuit, Arroyo fired at the vehicle of Deputy Sheriff John Smith who had pulled closely behind Arroyo's truck during the pursuit. After taking fire, Deputy Smith returned fire with his vehicle still in motion and used his patrol car to ram Arroyo's truck. Arroyo stopped his vehicle, exited it, and attempted to fire upon Smith, whose patrol car had essentially come to a stop on the passenger side of Arroyo's truck after ramming it. Smith sped away to avoid Arroyo's shots and gunfire from other law enforcement officers, leaving Officers Allen and Jacks in the direct line of fire.  With Arroyo now out of his vehicle, Sgt. Rusty Jacks exited Officer Allen's vehicle and fired five shots from his rifle, hitting Arroyo in the back of the head and killing him instantly as he attempted to get back into his vehicle.

Aftermath
The shooting was widely covered by national news organizations and video from the incident is readily accessible on the Internet.

Mark Wilson has been widely credited as heroic for his actions, which are believed to have caused Arroyo to cease his attack and flee the area without murdering his son, and the Texas House unanimously adopted a resolution (HR. 740) on March 31, 2005, to honor him.

Casualties
Mark Alan Wilson and Maribel Estrada were killed at the shooting scene.
David Hernandez Arroyo, Jr. was wounded in the leg, but survived.
Smith County sheriff's deputies Sherman Dollison, 28, and Marlin Suell, 38, were wounded during the incident.
Tyler police officer Clay Perrett was wounded during the incident.

See also
2003 Ennis shootings
Brian Nichols, Fulton County, Georgia courthouse shooter
Kirkwood City Council shooting
Marin County courthouse incident

References

External links
 Article on the method and ethics of defending others with a firearm.
 Story of the shooting with video of the incident.
 News article about the shooting
 Estrada's lawyer's remarks about Arroyo
Account of Mark Wilson's actions during the gunfight
Another account of Mark Wilson's actions

2005 murders in the United States
Tyler, Texas
Murder in Texas
2005 in Texas
Filmed killings
Mass shootings in Texas
Crimes in Texas
Deaths by firearm in Texas
Attacks in the United States in 2005
February 2005 crimes
February 2005 events in the United States
Mass shootings in the United States
2005 mass shootings in the United States